Il a déjà tes yeux is a 2016 Belgian-French comedy film directed by Lucien Jean-Baptiste.

Plot
Paul and Sali are a married black couple who are unable to have biological children, and have been struggling to adopt a child for a long time. When Sali finally receives the call that their adoption file is approved and that a 4-month-old white baby boy called Benjamin is available, it seems like nothing could go wrong anymore. Except for the fact that Sali's parents do not accept their white grandchild, and that the social worker Claire Mallet will do anything at her reach to stop Paul and Sali from adopting Benjamin.

Cast

 Lucien Jean-Baptiste as Paul Aloka
 Aïssa Maïga as Salimata Aloka
 Zabou Breitman as Claire Mallet
 Vincent Elbaz as Manu
 Michel Jonasz as Monsieur Vidal
 Naidra Ayadi as Anna
 Marie-Philomène Nga as Mamita
 Bass Dhem as Ousmane
 Delphine Théodore as Prune
 Sabine Pakora as Madame Diakité
 Marius Benchenafi as Benjamin (4 month)
 Mathéo Perard as Benjamin (1 year)
 Valérie Moreau as Madame Perez
 Grégoire Bonnet as Baptiste Mallet
 Guillaume Faure as matias
 Sara Mortensen as Kristina
 Maïmouna Gueye as Madame Diop
 Marie-Sohna Conde as Fatou
 Mariam Kaba as Madame Cissé
 Othniel Lefebvre as Gaspard

Development
The movie was first introduced during the Festival du Film Francophone d'Angoulême, in August 2016. The film was also screened at the 2016 Sarlat Film Festival.

References

External links
 

2016 films
2016 comedy films
French comedy films
2010s French-language films
Films set in France
2010s French films